Massari (born 1980) is a Lebanese-Canadian R&B, pop, and hip hop singer.

Massari, meaning "money" in some other Arabic dialects, may also refer to:

Places
Massari Arena, a seat multi-purpose arena in Pueblo, Colorado
Palazzo Massari, also known as the Palazzo Rosso, a palace located on Borso and Corso Porta Mare, in Ferrara, Italy
Pizzo Massari, a mountain in the Lepontine Alps, located in the canton of Ticino, Switzerland

Music
Massari (album), a 2005 album by Massari
Massari: Road to Success, a DVD released by Massari

People 
Ennio Massari Filonardi (died 1565), Roman Catholic prelate, Bishop of Montefeltro
Ettore Massari (1883-????), Italian gymnast
Giorgio Massari (1687–1766), prominent late-Baroque Venetian architect
Jacopo Massari (born 1988), Italian volleyball player
John Massari (born 1957), American composer and sound designer
Lea Massari (born 1933), Italian actress
Lucio Massari (1569–1633), Italian painter
Luigia Massari (1810–1898), Italian painter and embroiderer
Mohammad al-Massari, exiled Saudi physicist and political activist
William Massari (born 1990), professional Brazilian footballer